And You Were a Crow is American rock band The Parlor Mob's debut studio album. It was recorded for over two months at Echo Mountain Recording in Asheville, North Carolina and was released digitally by Roadrunner Records on March 11, 2008. The physical CD was released in the US on May 6, 2008. The track "Can't Keep No Good Boy Down" was used as the theme song for The Paul Finebaum Show on SEC Network in 2016 and during the end credits of the season 6 Entourage episode "One Car, Two Car, Red Car, Blue Car."  The track "Hard Times" is featured in the video game WWE SmackDown vs. Raw 2010 and is also featured in Nascar 09.

Track listing

Personnel 
The Parlor Mob
 Mark Melicia – lead vocals
 Paul Ritchie – guitar
 David Rosen – guitar
 Nicholas Villapiano – bass
 Samuel Bey – drums, backing vocals

Production
 Jacquire King – producer, recording engineer
 Matt Radosevich - recording engineer
 Julian Dreyer – assistant recording engineer
 Jon Ashley - assistant recording engineer
 Chris Bellman – mastering

Additional personnel
 Justin Faircloth:
 Piano - "When I Was An Orphan", "Can't Keep No Good boy Down", "Tide of Tears"
 Moog - "Everything You're Breathing For", "Hard Headed", "When I Was an Orphan", "Favorite Heart to Break"
 Rhodes - "Angry Young Girl"
 Matt Radosevich
 Acoustic guitar - "When I Was an Orphan
 Keyboard - "Dead Wrong", "The Kids"

References 

2008 albums
Roadrunner Records albums
The Parlor Mob albums
Albums produced by Jacquire King